Freak the Mighty is a young adult novel by Rodman Philbrick. Published in 1993, it was followed by the novel Max the Mighty in 1998. The primary characters are friends Maxwell Kane, a large, developmentally disabled, but kind-hearted boy, and Kevin Avery, nicknamed "Freak", who is physically disabled but very intelligent. Kevin is diagnosed with Morquio syndrome.

The novel was adapted for the screen under the title The Mighty by Charles Leavitt; the film was shot in Toronto, Ontario, Canada and Cincinnati, Ohio, and directed by Peter Chelsom, and released in 1998.

Plot
The novel is set in a version of Portsmouth, New Hampshire. In the beginning of the book, Maxwell Kane is a young boy with low self-esteem. He lives with his grandfather, Grim, and grandmother, Gram. Max thinks of himself as a big butthead. People are afraid of him because he looks like his father, Kenneth "Killer" Kane, a convicted murderer. Max sets the stage for the story by reminiscing about his time in daycare, when he had met a boy named Kevin, or Freak, as their classmates called him. Kevin has Morquio syndrome, wears leg braces and uses crutches, and thinks of himself as a robot and is bullied by many bigger kids due to his short height. However, Max likes Kevin and thinks the crutches and leg braces are neat.

Many years later, when Max is in middle school, he finds out that Freak and his mother, Gwen (referred to as "The Fair Guinevere") are moving into the house next door. When Max initially approaches Freak, Freak acts with hostility. However, sometime later, Max saves Kevin's toy ornithopter from a tree and they start to become friends. On the Fourth of July, they go to see the fireworks show and are attacked by an older boy, Tony "Blade" D. and his gang but avoid any mental or physical conflict. After the show, Blade chases the two with his gang after Freak calls him a cretin. Despite Max's lack of knowledge and disability, he escapes by acting on Freak's orders, but the two are driven into a muddy millpond, Freak riding on Max's shoulders.  Freak gets the attention of a nearby police car, who drives off Blade's gang and takes the boys home. After this incident, Kevin starts riding on Max's shoulders regularly. They begin to call themselves "Freak the Mighty". They go on adventures such as going to the hospital which Freak claims has a secret department called the "Bionics Department" which has had his brain CT scanned to be fitted into a bionic body.

On one adventure they find a woman's purse in the storm drain. They return it to the woman who is named Loretta Lee. She is the wife of Iggy Lee, leader of the Panheads, a motorcycle gang who "struck fear in everyone, even the cops", as Max puts it. Iggy says that the two of them once knew Max's father. They consider "having some fun" with the boys but don't because they are afraid that Max's father will get parole even though he's serving a life sentence. They also reveal that Kevin's father left once he heard that his son had a birth defect.

Freak has an emergency at school and is taken to the hospital.  Later, Grim reveals to Max that his father has been released from prison on parole. Throughout the story, it has been gradually revealed that Max's father killed his mother by strangling her. Grim and Gram dislike his dad, and are afraid of Max ending up like him. Grim threatens to buy a gun for the family's protection. Max is shocked and scared by the news of his father's parole. On Christmas Eve, Max is woken up by his father, Killer Kane, who has come to take him to train him to be his assistant. After Max is kidnapped by his father, the two walk to Iggy Lee's apartment in the Testaments.

Killer Kane is even bigger than Max and acts in a very threatening, intimidating manner towards everyone, including his son, whom he keeps tied up on a small chair. Killer Kane swears that he did not murder Max's mother and calls himself "a man of God". On Christmas morning he leaves Max alone, tied up in a room in an old abandoned apartment. Loretta, shocked that Kane would do something like that to his own child, tries to help him escape. Killer Kane catches her and starts to strangle her. He begins but is interrupted by Max. Max tries to get up and rips off the rope to which the old boiler has been attached. Max attempts to stop him and reveals that he witnessed his father kill his mother in the same fashion. Kane lets go of Loretta, letting her lie on the ground breathing like a "broken bird" and gives up on training Max to be his obedient assistant so he tries to murder him by strangling him, the same as what he did to Max's mother, but Freak arrives just in time and saves Max by squirting Kane with a squirt gun in the eye which he claims is filled with sulfuric acid when in fact, as Freak reveals later, it is filled with soap, vinegar, and curry powder. The police are waiting outside, and Killer Kane is taken back to prison and has to serve his original sentence plus ten years. Killer Kane pleads guilty.

After having a seizure on his birthday, Freak is admitted into the hospital, where he gives Max a blank book, telling him to write the story of Freak the Mighty in it. Max returns to the hospital the next day to find that Freak died because his heart became too big for his body. Dr. Spivak, Kevin's doctor, reveals that Freak knew he was going to have a very short life, but he told Max he was going to get a bionic body because it would give himself hope. The Fair Gwen moves away, with a new man she is in love with, and Max misses Freak's funeral, staying in his room, the "down under" for months. Not even Grim or Gram can get him out, until Grim orders Max to return to school. One day, Max sees Loretta, who tells him "Doing nothing's a drag, kid", so Max writes all of the adventures he and Freak had, in honor of his best friend.

Characters
Maxwell "Max" Kane is the main character and narrator of the story. He is described to be very big and have a striking resemblance to his father, Kenneth (Killer) Kane. In daycare, Max earned the nickname "Kicker" because he had a thing of booting and kicking anyone who dared to touch him, when he was a child. Max lives with his grandparents, Grim and Gram, and usually stays in "The Down Under", a small room in the basement. He hates his father, whom he witnessed killing his mother, Annie. He becomes best friends with Freak, who customarily rides on his shoulders and acts as Max's surrogate "brain".  Max becomes depressed after Freak dies, locking himself in "The Down Under" for days. He is also very insecure about himself. He usually calls himself a "butthead" and is never confident. Until Freak comes along, Max cannot read or write.
 Kevin "Freak" Avery is a disabled, blonde-haired boy whom Max becomes best friends with. Kevin has Morquio syndrome, where the outside of his body cannot grow. He walks on crutches and wears a leg brace. He is a genius for his age and size and is cuttingly sarcastic. He carries a dictionary with him. He is interested in robotics and the tales of King Arthur, to the extent of calling his mother Gwen "The Fair Gwen Of Air/Guinevere" and calling his adventures with Max "quests". Kevin looks forward to his surgery (which Max later finds out was a lie so he wouldn't know the truth), in which he will gain a robot's body. Unexpectedly on his 13th birthday, Kevin has a seizure. In the hospital, he dies, because as his doctor puts it, "his heart became too big for his body." In the film, Kevin's last name was changed from Avery to Dillon.
Grim is Maxwell's grandfather. His behavior is at first described as quite grim - thus explaining why Maxwell gave him the nickname - though he shows himself to be a kind and friendly person. He is hostile towards Max's father due to the murder of his daughter, Annie. In the book, Grim decides to shoot Kenneth if he sets foot in the house, after hearing about his release from jail. At first, Grim feels sorry for Kevin, but later, he appreciates Kevin's abilities and intelligence.
Gram is Maxwell's grandmother. Like her husband, she also dislikes Kenneth and misses her daughter, Annie. Gram is quite kind and polite, careful not to hurt anyone's feelings. She protests against shooting Kenneth once Grim announces that he will do so.
Gwen "Fair Gwen" Avery is Kevin's mother. Kevin nicknames her "Fair Gwen" after King Arthur's beautiful wife, Fair Guinevere. She and Maxwell's mother were friends until Kenneth Kane came along.  After her son's death, Gwen moves to California and starts a relationship with a man named Rick.
Kenneth "Kenny" David Kane (also known as Killer Kane) is the main antagonist of the book. He is Max's selfish and sociopathic father. He was sent to prison for strangling his wife to death. After his release from prison on parole, Kenny kidnaps Maxwell on Christmas Eve and takes him to Loretta and Iggy's apartment. Loretta Lee tries to save Max but ends up getting strangled by Kenneth, though she survives. Eventually, Kevin rescues Max by spraying a mixture of soap, vinegar and curry powder in Kenny's eyes, which he claimed was sulfuric acid. In the end, Kenny is jailed.
Loretta Lee is a thin, red-haired lady whose stolen purse is recovered by Freak and Max. She is married to the leader of a motorcycle gang named The Panheads, Iggy. Loretta is an alcoholic and a smoker and lives in the "poor" part of the town, the New Tenements. When she attempts to help Max escape, she is almost strangled to death by Kenny Kane.
Iggy Lee is an alcoholic, like Loretta, and lives with her in the Testaments. He is the boss of The Panheads, a motorcycle gang. It is suggested that he may have vertigo, as he states it makes him nervous looking up. He was also a friend of Maxwell's dad (Killer Kane), who makes him scared and nervous. He attempts to help rescue Max when he was kidnapped by his father. He is the husband of Loretta Lee.
Dr. Spivak is Kevin's doctor. She tells Max about Kevin's death and that the real cause of his death was his heart growing too big for his body.
Annie Kane is Maxwell's mother but does not appear in the book. She was brutally murdered by her husband, Kenneth Kane.
Tony D. is a juvenile delinquent who first encountered Max and Freak during the Fourth of July drunkenly asking them for M-80 fireworks. He along with his gang tried to harm Max and Freak with a knife. His gang steals Loretta Lee's purse. He later tells Max he's sorry about Kevin (Freak), who died after having a seizure, though Max doesn't like it and wants to be enemies with him. He is also known as "Blade".
Rick does not appear in this book. After Kevin Avery dies, he starts a relationship with Gwen Avery in California.
Mr. Meehan is Maxwell's reading skills tutor.
Mrs. Donelli is Maxwell's new English teacher.
Mrs. Addison is the school's principal.

References

1993 novels
Novels by Rodman Philbrick
American young adult novels
Novels about friendship
Novels set in New Hampshire
Scholastic Corporation books